The 25th Venice Biennale, held in 1950, was an exhibition of international contemporary art, with 23 participating nations. The Venice Biennale takes place biennially in Venice, Italy. Winners of the Gran Premi (Grand Prize) included French painter Henri Matisse, French sculptor Ossip Zadkine, Belgian etcher Frans Masereel, Italians painter Carlo Carrà, sculptor Marcello Mascherini ex aequo with Luciano Minguzzi, and etcher Giuseppe Viviani.

References

Bibliography

Further reading 

 
 
 
 
 
 
 
 
 
 
 
 
 
 
 
 
 

1950 in art
1950 in Italy
Venice Biennale exhibitions